Brandon Gomes  (born July 15, 1984) is an American former professional baseball pitcher and current baseball executive. He played for the Tampa Bay Rays of Major League Baseball (MLB) from 2011 to 2015. After his playing career ended, Gomes joined the Los Angeles Dodgers as a pitching coordinator. He was successively promoted to director of player development in 2017, an assistant general manager in 2019, and general manager in 2022.

Amateur career
Born and raised in Fall River, Massachusetts, Gomes attended Durfee High School. At Durfee, Gomes pitched and also played shortstop, hitting .425 with 14 home runs and 83 RBIs while also compiling a record of 19–5 with a 1.66 ERA and 287 strikeouts. Gomes, who was also a member of the National Honor Society, was Massachusetts High School Gatorade Player of the Year and also won All-State honors twice. After high school, Gomes attended Tulane University. After having a successful freshman season, Gomes had Tommy John surgery during his sophomore year, receiving a medical redshirt. As a redshirt sophomore, Gomes continued to work out of both the bullpen and starting rotation, but later became a full-time starter as a junior. As a senior, Gomes improved, going 7–6 with a 3.92 ERA and 74 strikeouts in 96.1 innings. In 2003 and 2006, Gomes played for the Falmouth Commodores of the Cape Cod Baseball League, going 2–2 with a 3.62 ERA for the team in 2006.

Professional playing career

San Diego Padres
Gomes was selected by the San Diego Padres in the seventeenth round (537th overall) of the 2007 MLB draft out of Tulane University. Gomes is of Portuguese and Italian heritage.

Tampa Bay Rays
In December 2010 Gomes was traded to The Tampa Bay Rays along with Adam Russell, Cesar Ramos and Cole Figueroa in exchange for Jason Bartlett and a player to be named later.

Gomes made his major league debut on May 3, 2011.

Chicago Cubs
On December 23, 2015, Gomes signed a minor league deal with the Chicago Cubs. He was released on June 4, 2016.

Pitching style
Gomes threw three pitches: a four-seam fastball (90-92 mph), a curveball (78-82), and a splitter (81-86). The curveball was primarily used against right-handed hitters, while left-handed hitters saw more of the splitter.

Baseball coach and executive

Los Angeles Dodgers organization
After his release from the Cubs, he joined the Los Angeles Dodgers organization as pitching coordinator of performance, part of the player development department. On December 1, 2017, he was promoted to director of player development.

Gomes was promoted to vice president and assistant general manager on March 17, 2019. On January 18, 2022, the Dodgers promoted Gomes to the position of general manager. Gomes cited his experience as an average player subject to several transactions throughout his career as instrumental to increasing his interest about the work of baseball executives.

References

External links

1984 births
Living people
People from Fall River, Massachusetts
Baseball players from Massachusetts
Major League Baseball pitchers
Tampa Bay Rays players
Tulane Green Wave baseball players
Falmouth Commodores players
Eugene Emeralds players
Fort Wayne Wizards players
Lake Elsinore Storm players
San Antonio Missions players
Durham Bulls players
Peoria Saguaros players
Charlotte Stone Crabs players
Gulf Coast Rays players
Iowa Cubs players
Los Angeles Dodgers executives
B.M.C. Durfee High School alumni
Major League Baseball general managers
American people of Portuguese descent